Sari Beyglu (also Romanized as Sārī Beyglū; also known as Sārī Beyglū-ye Kūchak) is a village in Garamduz Rural District, Garamduz District, Khoda Afarin County, East Azerbaijan Province, Iran. At the 2006 census, its population was 230, in 41 families. The village is populated by the Kurdish Chalabianlu tribe.

References 

Populated places in Khoda Afarin County
Kurdish settlements in East Azerbaijan Province